The 1988 Grambling State Tigers football team represented Grambling State University as a member of the Southwestern Athletic Conference (SWAC) during the 1988 NCAA Division I-AA football season. Led by 46th-year head coach Eddie Robinson, the Tigers compiled an overall record of 8–3 and a mark of 5–2 in conference play, and finished second in the SWAC.

Schedule

References

Grambling State
Grambling State Tigers football seasons
Grambling State Tigers football